Zdeněk Folprecht (born 1 July 1991) is a Czech professional footballer who plays as a midfielder for Czech National Football League club Vlašim.

Career
Folprecht joined Viktoria Žižkov on loan for a second spell in June 2011.

Folprecht joined Slovan Liberec in June 2015.

On 25 February 2022, he moved to Italy and signed with Serie C club Pistoiese.

References

External links
 
 
 

1991 births
Living people
Sportspeople from Kladno
Czech footballers
Association football midfielders
Czech Republic youth international footballers
Czech Republic under-21 international footballers
Czech First League players
Czech National Football League players
Azerbaijan Premier League players
Cypriot First Division players
Serie C players
AC Sparta Prague players
FK Viktoria Žižkov players
FC Zbrojovka Brno players
FC Slovan Liberec players
FC Fastav Zlín players
1. FK Příbram players
Neftçi PFK players
Pafos FC players
Ermis Aradippou FC players
Ethnikos Achna FC players
U.S. Pistoiese 1921 players
FC Sellier & Bellot Vlašim players
Czech expatriate footballers
Czech expatriate sportspeople in Azerbaijan
Czech expatriate sportspeople in Cyprus
Czech expatriate sportspeople in Italy
Expatriate footballers in Azerbaijan
Expatriate footballers in Cyprus
Expatriate footballers in Italy